Kayla Uddenberg (born 24 October 2005) is a footballer who plays as a midfielder for Vaughan Azzurri in League1 Ontario. Born in Canada, she represents the Saint Kitts and Nevis women's national team. She is the youngest player to ever represent Saint Kitts and Nevis internationally at the age of 13 years and 341 days.

Early life
Born in Canada, Uddenberg played youth soccer with Aurora FC and for the Our Lady Queen of the World Catholic Academy (formerly Jean Vanier CSS) high school soccer team.

Club career
In 2022, she played for Vaughan Azzurri in League1 Ontario, making her debut on May 29 against Tecumseh SC.

International career
Born in Canada, Uddenberg and her sisters are eligible to represent Saint Kitts and Nevis internationally, where their paternal grandparents were born.

Uddenberg began her international career with the Saint Kitts and Nevis U15 team in 2018.

On 30 September 2019, she made her debut for the  Saint Kitts and Nevis senior team at the 2020 CONCACAF Women's Olympic Qualifying Championship qualification tournament against the Dominican Republic at the age of 13 years and 341 days, becoming the youngest player to ever represent St. Kitts and Nevis and the 11th youngest women's international debut. She played significant minutes at the qualification tournament, helping the country qualify for the main Olympics qualification tournament, where she was the youngest player in the entire tournament.

Personal life
Uddenberg's sisters, Cloey and Carley, are also members of the Saint Kitts and Nevis women's national football team.

References

External links

2005 births
Living people
Citizens of Saint Kitts and Nevis through descent
Saint Kitts and Nevis women's footballers
Women's association football midfielders
Saint Kitts and Nevis women's international footballers
Sportspeople from Aurora, Ontario
Soccer people from Ontario
Canadian people of Saint Kitts and Nevis descent
Sportspeople of Saint Kitts and Nevis descent
Aurora FC (Canada) players
Vaughan Azzurri (women) players
League1 Ontario (women) players